Carlos Reina Aranda (born 27 July 1980) is a Spanish former professional footballer who played mainly as a forward.

He amassed La Liga totals of 169 games and 28 goals over 11 seasons after emerging from Real Madrid's youth academy, representing in the competition Villarreal, Albacete, Sevilla, Numancia, Osasuna, Levante, Zaragoza and Granada. He added 125 matches and 33 goals in the Segunda División, in a 17-year senior career.

Club career
Aranda was born in Málaga, Andalusia. A product of Real Madrid's youth system, he never appeared, however, in any La Liga matches with the first team. He played, however, a small part in two UEFA Champions League-winning squads, appearing against Molde FK (1999–2000) and FC Lokomotiv Moscow (2001–02).

In January 2002, Aranda moved to CD Numancia, being instrumental in helping the Soria club barely retain its second division status. This prompted a move at the end of the season to Villarreal CF on a five-year deal but, as opportunities were scarce with the Valencian Community side, he returned to Numancia in January 2003.

Aranda joined Sevilla FC in 2004–05, scoring in his UEFA Cup debut, a 2–0 home win over Alemannia Aachen on 4 November 2004. He was relatively used during the campaign, but was deemed surplus to requirements after the arrivals of Luís Fabiano, Frédéric Kanouté and Javier Saviola, and left for Albacete Balompié on loan – he had already represented the Castile-La Mancha team the previous season.

Aranda's second spell with Albacete finished on a sour note, as he was accused of unprofessional behaviour by the club. He responded claiming he had been forced to appear at a press conference to show repentance for his actions.

After being instrumental in Real Murcia's return to the top flight in 2007 by netting 11 goals, squad second-best behind Iván Alonso, Aranda had an unassuming spell with Granada 74 CF. After spending the first months of 2008–09 training with lowly CF Gavà, he signed in December 2008 with Numancia for a third stint, appearing and scoring regularly but eventually suffering first division relegation.

On 16 July 2009, Aranda moved to CA Osasuna as part of a deal that saw Enrique Sola move in the opposite direction, on loan for a season. In his second year with the Navarrese, he scored four times but also struggled with injuries and loss of form, and Sola also returned to the team's setup, eventually finishing as top scorer.

In July 2011, aged 31, Aranda signed for Levante UD. In January of the following year, after having received very little playing time, he switched to fellow league side Real Zaragoza; on 25 February 2012, he put the visitors ahead at hometown's Málaga CF, who eventually won it 5–1.

Aranda switched clubs again in the winter transfer window of 2013, signing for his eighth in the Spanish top flight, Granada CF, the most for any player.

Honours
Real Madrid
UEFA Champions League: 1999–2000, 2001–02

References

External links

1980 births
Living people
Spanish footballers
Footballers from Málaga
Association football forwards
La Liga players
Segunda División players
Segunda División B players
Real Madrid C footballers
Real Madrid Castilla footballers
Real Madrid CF players
CD Numancia players
Villarreal CF players
Albacete Balompié players
Sevilla FC players
Real Murcia players
Granada 74 CF footballers
CA Osasuna players
Levante UD footballers
Real Zaragoza players
Granada CF footballers
UD Las Palmas players
UEFA Champions League winning players
Spain youth international footballers